The Earl Campbell Tyler Rose Award is an award given annually to the "top offensive player in Division I football who also exhibits the enduring characteristics that define Earl Campbell: integrity, performance, teamwork, sportsmanship, drive, community and tenacity." The award was established in 2012 by the Tyler Chamber of Commerce in Tyler, Texas and is presented by SPORTyler, Inc., in conjunction with the City of Tyler, the Tyler Convention & Visitors Bureau and Tyler Area Chamber of Commerce.

Criteria
The award is given to the top offensive player in NCAA Division I football who also exhibits the enduring characteristics that define Earl Campbell: integrity, performance, teamwork, sportsmanship, drive, community and tenacity; specifically tenacity to persist and determination to overcome adversity and injury in pursuit of reaching goals. Additionally, the award is limited to players who were born in the state of Texas, attended a Texas high school, or attended a Texas junior college or university.

Winners

Winners by school

References

External links
 

College football regional and state awards
American football in Texas
Awards established in 2012
2012 establishments in Texas